Hiroyasu Aizawa (born 1 March 1961) is a Japanese former ski jumper. In the World Cup his highest place was thirteenth in December 1979 in Cortina d'Ampezzo. He also won a bronze medal at the 1979 World Junior Championships and competed at the 1980 Winter Olympics.

References

External links

1961 births
Living people
Japanese male ski jumpers
Olympic ski jumpers of Japan
Ski jumpers at the 1980 Winter Olympics